= Lisha Kill Natural Area =

- Lisha Kill
- Location within New York
- Nearest city: Albany
- Coordinates: 42.8°N 73.86°W
- Area: 135 to 140 acre
- Established: 1968
- Governing body: The Nature Conservancy
- Website: www.nature.org/en-us/get-involved/how-to-help/places-we-protect/lisha-kill-natural-area/

The Lisha Kill Natural Area is located near Albany New York. The site is closed between late February and early May due to erosion concerns. The area is 135 to 140 acres. The Natural Area is administered by The Nature Conservancy. It was established in the 1960s.
